Tomb TT190, located in the necropolis of El-Assasif in Thebes, Egypt, is the tomb of Esbanebded and part of the TT192 tomb complex.

Esbanebded was a divine father and prophet at the head of the king dating to the Twenty-sixth Dynasty of Egypt. His parents are Pakharkhons (a divine father) and Meramuniotes (Sistrumplayer of Amen-Re). He had a son who was named Pakharkhons after his grandfather.

References

Theban tombs
Twenty-sixth Dynasty of Egypt